Duliajan Assembly constituency is one of the 126 assembly constituencies of Assam Legislative Assembly. Duliajan forms part of the Dibrugarh Lok Sabha constituency.

Members of Legislative Assembly 
 1978: Jogendra Nath Hazarika, Janata Party
 1985: Amiya Gogoi, Indian National Congress
 1991: Amiya Gogoi, Indian National Congress
 1996: Amiya Gogoi, Indian National Congress
 2001: Rameswar Teli, Bharatiya Janata Party
 2006: Rameswar Teli, Bharatiya Janata Party
 2011: Amiya Gogoi, Indian National Congress
 2016: Terash Gowalla, Bharatiya Janata Party
 2021: Terash Gowalla, Bharatiya Janata Party

Election results

2016 result

See also
List of constituencies of the Assam Legislative Assembly

References

External links 
 

Assembly constituencies of Assam